Ladestien is a broad walking track that strolls along the Trondheimsfjord around the entire Lade Peninsula in the municipality of Trondheim in Sør-Trøndelag county, Norway. The western part climbs small hilltops, often with a beautiful view of the Trondheimsfjord. The eastern part is almost flat. 

There is lush vegetation along the track, with birch, pine, spruce, Rowan, alder, and hazel, the latter being very common in the western part of the track. In addition, sycamore maple, although not a part of the original flora, is rapidly spreading and is now among the most common trees. Further east, Statoils large research center at Rotvoll is easily spotted as the track continues east. Also at Rotvoll is the Leangen Manor, including an English-inspired garden, with small water ponds and large deciduous trees (ash, elm, maple, oak). The manor is owned by Trondheim municipality and used for representational purposes. 

There are several beaches (mainly rocky or with pebbles) along Ladestien, some of the most popular are Ringvebukta (not far from Ringve Museum and botanical garden) and Djupvika; the latter includes a large lawn and volleyball net. In nice summer weather, a walk along the lush Ladestien with the calm waves from the fjord rolling gently against rocks and beaches might give associations to places much further south.

Media gallery

References

External links
Pictures from Ladestien on flickr

Geography of Trondheim
Hiking trails in Norway